2d Sans Faces (or 2 Dés Sans Faces or even 2dsf) is a game publishing house based in Romande Switzerland. Its goals are to create and publish aspects of games, including works of fiction, tabletop role-playing games, and reference documents for the leisure industry.

History

2d Sans Faces was founded in January 2001, to produce the first translation and publication under licence of Nobilis in the French language, and later, to develop and publish under licence Nightprowler and Tigres Volants. The legal structure adopted was that of a cooperative society as under Swiss law, this allowed them to choose their cooperative members. Since 2017, 2d Sans Faces has published the adaptation of the acclaimed Norwegian surreal fantastic Itras By and as a design studio, created the Freaks' Squeele super-heroes role-playing game for Ankama.

Published games
Nobilis (2001), by Jenna K. Moran (as R.Sean Borgstrom) where players play demi-gods at war with the forces of evil.
Nightprowler Second Edition (2006), by Team NP2, a medieval fantasy game with the urban feel of Croc
Tigres Volants (2006), by Stéphane "Alias" Gallay, a multicultural space-opera.
Itras By (2018), French translation of the surrealistic role-playing game by Ole Peder Giæver and Martin Bull Gudmundsen.

External links 

 

Role-playing game publishing companies
Companies based in the canton of Vaud
Publishing companies of Switzerland
Publishing companies established in 2001